Pipers Corner School is an private independent day school for girls in Great Kingshill, Buckinghamshire, England.
There are 605 pupils aged from 4 to 18 years. The school is an Educational Charitable Trust administered by a Board of Governors.
Its current headmistress is Helen Ness-Gifford. There are three age groups: Pre-Prep for 4 to 7 years old; Prep for 7–11; and Senior for 11–18.

History
The school was first established in 1930 by Miss Jessie Cross as the Old Vicarage School, Richmond. It moved to Prestwood Lodge, Buckinghamshire during The Blitz on London in the Second World War and officially opened at the present site on 23 March 1946, after the purchase of the Pipers Corner property in July 1945.

The school started with 11 girls in Grove Park in Chiswick in 1930, moving to Richmond Hill in 1931 and splitting between two sites in 1935, the second being Prestwood in Buckinghamshire. The school finally settled in its current site in the winter of 1945.

By 1955 the number of pupils had doubled and there were 162 girls attending the school. Additions to the school took place throughout the 1950s, 1960s and 1970s included the Chapel, an outside swimming pool, the new building and subsequently Founders Wing and the Landau Hall.

In more recent years the inner courtyard was transformed into the glorious atrium, the Orchard Pool was built and a fitness suite was added.

Today, Pipers Corner is a magnificent school that has 605 students ranging in age from 4–18 years. The ethos of academic excellence coupled with a nurturing environment that encourages every girl to achieve her potential, is the same one that has prevailed since the school’s conception over 90 years ago.

Facilities, curriculum and extra-curricular activities

There are a wide range of facilities, including an indoor swimming pool, arts theater (stage, dance studios and a cafe) dance studios, drama studios, a ceramics room, art studios, numerous ICT suites, music rooms, a large sports hall, four tennis/netball courts, astro-turf (including hockey, netball and tennis courts), a rock climbing wall, science laboratories and seven humanities rooms. In-school music lessons are available, including violin, clarinet, drums, guitar and singing.
There are many clubs and extra-curriculum activities for the girls to enjoy, including swimming, netball, choir and debating.

Notable alumni

Ana Mulvoy-Ten, actress
E. L. James, Author
Kelly Osbourne
Harley Bird, Actress

References

External links 
School Website
Profile on the ISC website
Profile at MyDaughter
Department for Education Performance Tables 2011

Private schools in Buckinghamshire
Girls' schools in Buckinghamshire
Boarding schools in Buckinghamshire
Member schools of the Girls' Schools Association
Educational institutions established in 1930
1930 establishments in England